Mór Lipót Herzog (1869-1934) was a Jewish Hungarian art collector, banker, and large estate owner whose art collection is the object of Holocaust-related restitution claims.

Life 
Herzog, known as Baron Herzog, was born in 1869 in Budapest and was Jewish. He participated in the Sonderbund westdeutscher Kunstfreunde und Künstler.

He died on November 19, 1934 in Budapest. He was buried at Fiumei Street Cemetery.

He is also known as: Mor Lipot Herzog, Mór Lipót Herzog de Csete, Baron Mór Lipót Herzog, Moriz Leopold Herzog von Csete

Art Collection 
Herzog's art collection was the largest in Hungary and contained many masterpieces.

The collection was estimated to contain more than 2000 artworks including The Rue Mosnier Dressed with Flags and La Négresse by Manet as well as Francisco de Zurbarán’s portrait of Saint Andrew, The Annunciation to Joachim by Lucas Cranach the Elder( 1518) and The Annunciation to Joachim by Lucas Cranach the Elder (1518)

Nazi looting and lawsuits for restitution 
Martha Nierenberg, his granddaughter, tried for many years to recover art looted from the Herzog family.

In 2010, his heirs sued the Hungarian government for the return of more than 40 paintings seized during World War II, valued in excess of US$ 100 million. 

The case reached the United States Supreme court as De Csepel et al. v. Republic of Hungary et al.

References 

Jewish art collectors
Nazi-looted art
Jewish Hungarian history
1869 births
1934 deaths